Petrolacosaurus ("rock lake lizard") is an extinct genus of diapsid reptile from the late Carboniferous period. This means that it was at the base of Diapsida, the largest and most successful radiation of reptiles that would eventually include all modern reptile groups, as well as dinosaurs (which survive to the modern day as birds) and other famous extinct reptiles such as plesiosaurs, ichthyosaurs, and pterosaurs. However, Petrolacosaurus itself was part of Araeoscelida, a short-lived early branch of the diapsid family tree which went extinct in the mid-Permian.

Discovery 
The first Petrolacosaurus fossil was found in 1932 in Garnett, Kansas, by a field expedition from the University of Kansas Natural History Museum. The party consisted of Henry H. Lane, Claude Hibbard, David Dunkle, Wallace Lane, Louis Coghill, and Curtis Hesse. Unfortunately, no field notes or documentation of their discovery are available.

Petrolacosaurus fossils were found preserved within a layer of laminated shale that was also plant bearing. The strata that the remains were found in the middle Gzhelian age (middle Stephanian age on the European scale) of the Upper Pennsylvanian.

Description

Skull 

Specimens reveal that Petrolacosaurus had a slightly elongated skull with two temporal fenestrae. The upper temporal fenestra is located posteriorly to an enlarged orbit. This is a distinctly diapsid character.

The largest teeth in the jaw were at the front of the snout, erupting from the premaxilla bone. There were also a few larger-than average teeth further back on the maxilla, which were probably homologous with caniform teeth retained from the common ancestor between true sauropsid reptiles and synapsids (mammal ancestors). On the dentary, there are marginal teeth, displaying a primitive type of shallow implantation. The palatal arrangement bears close resemblance to Youngoides.

Axial skeleton 
There are seven elongated cervical vertebrae, 2 sacrals, and 60 caudal vertebrae. The number and placement of the vertebrae show that Petrolacosaurus was a rather long-necked reptile with a shorter torso. The number and spool-like shape of the vertebrae, in addition to the poses that the reptiles died in, show that they were also very flexible creatures.

The vertebral centra were amphicoelous (concave from the front and behind) and had large ventrolateral depressions. A similar depression can be seen on the massive neural arches, running from the prezygapophyses to the postzygapophysis. These depressions allowed the vertebral column to be lighter while still retaining a sturdy build.

Pectoral girdle 
The pectoral girdle in Petrolacosaurus is light in comparison to the massive girdles found in taxa such as pelycosaurs. Petrolacosaurus specimens had a clavicle with an expanded ventral blade, yet shorter than that of Captorhinus or pelycosaurs. Also, there is a large cleithrum with a broad, rounded end.

Limbs 

The limbs of Petrolacosaurus were long and slender in comparison to other primitive diapsids such as Araeoscelis.

The radius and ulna in Petrolacosaurus are of relatively equal length. Unlike these two bones, the fibula is significantly shorter than the tibia, because the tibia has distal articulation with the astragalus. This length difference is further pronounced because the astragalus has a long-neck and buttressed, oblique platform providing an inflexible, concave articulation with the tibia. This articulation creates a virtually immobile joint between the two.

Petrolacosaurus has a phalangeal formula for the manus of 2-3-4-5-3. For the pes, the formula is 2-3-4-5-4. The digits increase in length from digit I-digit V. Metatarsal IV is 3.5 times as long as metatarsal I. Many lines of post-Paleozoic reptiles have a reduction in digit IV in the manus and pes, indicating that Petrolacosaurus is more primitive than those reptiles.

Classification 
Although originally described as a pelycosaur, Petrolacosaurus is a member of the basal diapsid order Araeoscelidia, along with the aquatic, late Pennsylvanian Spinoaequalis.

The specific taxonomic placement of Petrolacosaurus is a highly debated topic. Because of the unusual osteological characters and how old the reptile is, scientists go back and forth between what position makes the most sense.

Some paleontologists are skeptical of Petrolacosaurus''' current placement because of large lapses in the fossil record, specifically between the earliest known neodiapsid fossils (appearing in the Lower Permian) and their proliferation in the Late Permian.

Current phylogenetic placement indicates that  Petrolacosaurus is derived from a sister to Spinoaequalis, a second species of early diapsid. In contrast to Spinoaequalis, Petrolacosaurus exhibits many distinct cranial and post-cranial features, characteristic of the most primitive diapsids.

The fact that Petrolacosaurus has features that are distinctly similar to other romeriidans and others which were very primitive, leads scientists to believe that the species is old enough to be an ancestor of neodiapsids. Because Petrolacosaurus does not have more developed features that the neodiapsids have, it has been placed in a group separate from Neodiapsida.

 Phylogeny 

Phylogenetic relationships based on De Braga & Reisz (1995) and Falconnet & Steyer (2007).

 Paleobiology 

 Diet Petrolacosaurus teeth were of moderate length, slightly recurved, and possessed no lateral compression. Located on the premaxilla of the upper jaw are two teeth, reminiscent of fangs. On the dentary were around 25 smaller teeth, all of different lengths. Placement in the jaw reveals that the teeth on the upper and lower jaw do not interlock but rather meet along a medial plane. The haphazard tooth lengths is consistent with a primitive method of regular tooth replacement. The teeth located on the transverse flange of the pterygoid were significantly larger than the others, indicating that these teeth were specialized for grabbing smaller, hard shelled insects.

The jaws of Petrolacosaurus were long and slender. Based on the skeletal muscle attachment points and the shortened temporal region, adductor muscles would have had limited amounts of leverage, resulting in a quick but weak bite. This is further support for the hypothesis that Petrolacosaurus was insectivorous.

 Environment 
The mud that the reptile was fossilized in is known to create well preserved insect and plant prints, allowing extrapolation about the surrounding environment. Because of fossil evidence of winged insects, the fruits of conifers, and other pteridosperms, Petrolacosaurus is thought to be a completely terrestrial reptile that lived in a conifer-fern forest.

The front limb is 135 mm and the back limb is 165 mm, giving the reptile a length ratio of almost 1x as long as the dorsal-sacral region. Petrolacosaurus also has a zeugopodium in both its front and hind limbs that is longer than the stylopodium. In aquatic reptile species, a shorter zeugopodium and longer stylopodium are characteristic in fins. Both this length relationship and a wide sacral rib in Petrolacosaurus are indicative of a sprawled, quadrupedal posture. The elongation of limbs were also adaptations for faster locomotion.

The terrestrial nature and coniferous habitat of Petrolacosaurus bring into question whether or not this genus could climb trees. In 1942, Robert Mertens published an analysis of reptiles that had the morphological traits that conferred with the ability to climb. Among other traits, the main synapomorphies are:
 Long digits
 Strongly decurved digits on the front and hind limbs. 
The distal tips of the phalanges of Petrolacosaurus has very large and solidly developed lateral tuberosities. These processes on these bones served as attachments for ligaments. On the most distal phalanges, Petrolacosaurus had moderately decurved areas where moderate claws would have attached. The elongated digits and moderate decurved points with claws point to Petrolacosaurus being a moderate climber, perhaps only when being cornered by a predator.

 References 

 Further reading 
 deBraga, M. & Reisz, R. R. (1995) - A new diapsid reptile from the uppermost Carboniferous (Stephanian) of Kansas. Palaeontology 38: 199-212
 Falconnet, J. & Steyer, J.-S. (2007) - Revision, osteology and locomotion of Aphelosaurus, an enigmatic reptile from the Lower Permian of France. Journal of Morphology'' (abstract of the 8th International Congress of Vertebrate Morphology, Paris, July 2007): 38.
 

Prehistoric reptile genera
Prehistoric diapsids
Carboniferous reptiles of North America
Carboniferous United States
Terrestrial locomotion
Fossil taxa described in 1945